José Antonio Villarrubia Jiménez-Momediano (born 17 November 1961) – known professionally as José Villarrubia – is a Spanish-American artist and art teacher who has done considerable work in the American comic book industry, particularly as a colorist.

Biography
Villarrubia was born in Madrid, moved to Baltimore, Maryland, in 1980. His fine art photography has been exhibited in the U.S., Latin America and Europe, in institutions such as the Baltimore Museum of Art and the Inter-American Development Bank. From 2011 to 2016 he was Chair of the Illustration Department of the Maryland Institute College of Art, where he is a professor. He is currently the coordinator of the Sequential Art Concentration. Before the Maryland Institute College of Art he had taught at Towson University, the Baltimore School for the Arts and the Walters Art Museum. He has lectured extensively about art at Johns Hopkins University, the College Art Association, Dickinson College,  the ICA in London, the Williem de Kooning Academy, the Naples Academy of Art, and the MacWorld UK Convention.

In comics, Villarrubia has done digitally manipulated illustrations for Veils, Promethea and The Sentry. As a colorist he is frequent collaborator of Jae Lee (Hellshock, Fantastic Four 1234, Captain America), Bill Sienkiewicz (Sentry/Hulk, X-Men Unlimited), J.H. Williams III (Promethea, Desolation Jones), Paul Pope (Solo, Project Superior, Batman: Year 100, Wednesday Comics), Jeff Lemire (Sweet Tooth, Trillium), Kaare Andrews (Spider-Man/Doctor Octopus: Year One, Wolverine, Spider-Man: Reign), Ryan Sook  (Spider-Man Unlimited, X-Factor The Return of Bruce Wayne) and Richard Corben (CAGE, Ghost Rider, Conan the Cimmerian, Starr). He has won the 2006 Comicdom Award for best colorist for his work on X-Factor, has been nominated twice for the Eisner Award for best colorist and has been included in The Society of Illustrators Annual Exhibition.

With writer Alan Moore, he has produced two illustrated books, both published by Top Shelf Productions: Voice of the Fire and The Mirror of Love. The latter is a love poem and a detailed history of homosexuality, prominently featuring famous figures in art and literature. It originally began as a part of the AARGH! Anthology in 1988. AARGH! [Artists Against Rampant Government Homophobia] was a comic book protest against Britain's proposed anti-gay Section 28. It was translated and published in French as Le Miroir de l'amour (November 2006), by Carabas Revolution, in Italian as Lo Specchio dell'Amore (September 2008) by Edizioni BD and in Spanish as El Espejo del amor (November 2008) by Editorial Kraken. In 2020 Giangiacomo Feltrinelli Editori published a new edition with a new Italian translation by Marco Rosary.

In 2006 he worked with Paul Pope in the series Batman: Year 100, which won the 2007 Eisner Award for "Best Limited Series".

The longest running project in which Villarrubia has been involved has been the comics series Sweet Tooth, where he colored almost all 40 issues (written and drawn by Jeff Lemire from 2009 to 2013). Netflix is producing a live-action series based in the comic. Netflix's Sweet Tooth will star Christian Convery and Nonso Anozie. The show itself will be managed by co-showrunners Jim Mickle and Beth Schwartz. In 2020 Lemire and Villarrubia returned to the character in a new series published under DC Comics' Black Label Imprint. The series is titled Sweet Tooth: The Return.

In 2010, he worked in the story featured in Unknown Soldier issues #13-14, with Joshua Dysart and Pat Masioni. The story won the prestigious Glyph Comics Award for Story of the Year. The Glyph Comics Awards recognize the best in comics made by, for, and about people of color.

Villarrubia won the 2011 Harvey Award for Best Colorist for his work on Cuba: My Revolution.

From 2012 to 2018, Villarrubia colored the three graphic novels by Anthony Bourdain: Get Jiro!, Get Jiro: Blood and Sushi and Hungry Ghosts Sony Pictures is currently developing Hungry Ghosts as an animated series.

In 2013 he worked with Reginald Hudlin and artist Denys Cowan on the graphic novel adaptation of Django Unchained. It was nominated that year for the Eisner Award.

In 2015, among other artists, José Villarrubia brought inner illustrations to the core rulebook of a role-playing game, Conan: Adventures in an Age Undreamed Of, first published in 2016 by Modiphius Entertainment.

The art team of Tomás Giorello and Villarrubia won the 2016 Rankin Award from the Robert E. Howard Foundation for their work on King Conan: Wolves Beyond the Border.

He won the 2017 Carlos Giménez Award for Best Colorist.

He colored the first five issues of America, the first LatinX LGBT+ Marvel superhero. It was written and drawn by an entire Hispanic team that included two members of the LGBT+ community, the writer Gabby Rivera and Villarrubia. It was nominated for a 2017 GLAAD Award.

Also, in 2017 he worked with writer Sarah Vaughn and Filipino artist Lan Medina in Deadman: Dark Mansion of Forbidden Love. It featured the first non-binary African-American character in a DC Comics publication. It was also nominated for a GLAAD Award.

In 2018 he edited and colored the comic series Infidel, published by Image Comics. Michael Sugar and TriStar optioned the rights to turn it into a film. Hany Abu-Assad signed on to direct the film adaptation.

In 2019 Casterman published the first French language graphic novel completely colored by Villarrubia. A new chapter of the series Le Transperceneige (Snowpiercer: Extinctions), the comic was written and illustrated by series co-creator Jean-Marc Rochette. The publishing of this new volume was timed originally to coincide with the release of the new Snowpiercer TV series that adapts this comic. The series was produced by TNT and premiered on May 17, 2020.

DC Comics' prestige imprint Black Label published two series colored by Villarrubia launched in November 2020, Sweet Tooth: The Return, where he reunited with collaborator Jeff Lemire and the long delayed The Other History of the DC Universe, written by John Ridley.

In 2021 he edited Hércules 1417, published in Spanish by Nuevo Nueve, written Pedro Víllora and illustrated by Das Pastoras. It's a book based on the writings of Enrique de Villena describing the Labors of Hercules.

Interviews
The DVD of the documentary feature film The Mindscape of Alan Moore contains an interview with Villarubia about his collaboration with Alan Moore.

References

External links

The Gay Men Project, November 21012
Clyde Fitch Report, September 2012
GayCities, November 2008
Newsarama (part 1), August 2008
Newsarama (part 2), August 2008
Comic Book Bin, April 2004
Slush Factory, March 2003
PopImage, March 2000

1961 births
Living people
Artists from Madrid
Comics colorists
Harvey Award winners for Best Colorist
Spanish gay artists
LGBT comics creators
21st-century Spanish LGBT people
Maryland Institute College of Art alumni
Maryland Institute College of Art faculty
Spanish comics artists
Spanish illustrators
Spanish photographers
Towson University faculty